Jorge Enrique Tejeira (born c. 1948) is a retired Panamanian jockey in United States Thoroughbred horse racing. He rode at venues across the United States and won a number of riding titles, including seasonal/annual championships at Philadelphia Park Racetrack in Pennsylvania and in California at Del Mar Racetrack and Santa Anita Park.

Anthony LaBruto was his friend and agent.

Biography
Tejeira was born in a small town about two hundred miles from Panama City.

On June 16, 1976, he put his name in the record books by winning eight races in a single day. He won three at Keystone Racetrack near Philadelphia and five at Atlantic City Race Course in New Jersey.

Tejeira retired from racing having won 3,419 races. 

Following its formation in 2011, Jorge Tejeira was inducted into the Parx Racing Hall of Fame.

References

 2008 American Racing Manual, Daily Racing Form Publications.

1940s births
Living people
American jockeys
Panamanian jockeys
Panamanian emigrants to the United States